James Matola (born 31 May 1977 in Harare) is a Zimbabwean football defender. He was once a member of the Zimbabwe national football.

External links
 
 Player profile

1977 births
Living people
Sportspeople from Harare
Zimbabwean footballers
Zimbabwean expatriate footballers
Zimbabwe international footballers
Association football defenders
Zimbabwean expatriate sportspeople in South Africa
Free State Stars F.C. players
SuperSport United F.C. players
Expatriate soccer players in South Africa
2006 Africa Cup of Nations players
F.C. Buffalo (South Africa) players
Batau F.C. players
Carara Kicks F.C. players